The Singar Mosque is a 15th-century mosque which is part of the Mosque City of Bagerhat, a World Heritage Site in south-western Bangladesh. It is a single-domed, square building of exposed brick with terracotta decorations.

Location
The Singar Mosque is part of the Mosque City of Bagerhat in south-western Bangladesh.

History
The mosque has no inscription by which it can be dated. Architect Abu Sayeed M Ahmed estimates that it is from the 15th century. Other experts believe, based on the known ages of stylistically similar local buildings, that it was built in the mid-15th century. There is archaeological evidence that at one time the mosque compound was surrounded by a wall with towers at the corners and an entrance gate on the east.

Banglapedia describes the mosque's condition in the early 1970s as "in utter ruin". The government's Department of Archaeology took over the site in 1975. In 1984, archaeologist Johanna E. van Lohuizen de Leeuw wrote that the building had been partly restored, but "its corner towers are still in a shocking state". The Mosque City of Bagerhat, of which Singair Mosque is a part, was inscribed on the list of World Heritage Sites in 1985. The mosque was rated as being in a "fair state of preservation" in the 2010s.

Architecture

The mosque is a square of 43'9" x 43'9" externally while internally it has a square plan of 26'0" x 26'0". It has a single hemispherical dome. The entirety is constructed of brick. There are three doorways in the east, and one each in the north and south. The central doorway in the east is higher and wider than the others. The exterior of the west wall has a mihrab projection from the ground to the cornice. At the four corners of the building are engaged circular towers which rise to roof level. The cornice is gently curved, being  higher at the center than at the ends.

The doorways are pointed archways set within rectangular recesses, at the top of which are several horizontal rows of terracotta ornamentation. The corner towers are divided horizontally at regular intervals by raised bands. The cornice has two bands decorated with terracotta.

The interior has a single mihrab in the qibla wall, on axis with the central entrance in the east. It is flanked by two decorated octagonal pilasters from which springs a multifoil arch with terracotta rosettes in the spandrels. All these are bordered by two rectangular frames, the space between which is filled with a four-petalled mesh in terracotta. To each side of the mihrab is a multifoil arched niche in a rectangular recess. The north and south walls each have two similar, but smaller niches.

Squinches spring from brick pilasters to support the base of the dome.

See also
 List of mosques in Bangladesh
 List of archaeological sites in Bangladesh

Notes

References

External links
 

Mosques in Bagerhat
Indo-Islamic architecture